Pepsi is a carbonated soft drink manufactured by PepsiCo. Originally created and developed in 1893 by Caleb Bradham and introduced as Brad's Drink, it was renamed as Pepsi-Cola in 1898, and then shortened to Pepsi in 1961.

History

Pepsi was first invented in 1893 as "Brad's Drink" by Caleb Bradham, who sold the drink at his drugstore in New Bern, North Carolina.

It was renamed Pepsi-Cola in 1898, "Pepsi" because it was advertised to relieve dyspepsia (indigestion) and "Cola" referring to the cola flavor. Some have also suggested that "Pepsi" may have been a reference to the drink aiding digestion like the digestive enzyme pepsin, but pepsin itself was never used as an ingredient to Pepsi-Cola.

The original recipe also included sugar and vanilla. Bradham sought to create a fountain drink that was appealing and would aid in digestion and boost energy.

In 1903, Bradham moved the bottling of Pepsi from his drugstore to a rented warehouse. That year, Bradham sold 7,968 gallons of syrup. The next year, Pepsi was sold in six-ounce bottles, and sales increased to 19,848 gallons. In 1909, automobile race pioneer Barney Oldfield was the first celebrity to endorse Pepsi, describing it as "A bully drink...refreshing, invigorating, a fine bracer before a race." The advertising theme "Delicious and Healthful" was then used over the next two decades.

In 1923, the Pepsi-Cola Company entered bankruptcy—in large part due to financial losses incurred by speculating on the wildly fluctuating sugar prices as a result of World War I. Assets were sold and Roy C. Megargel bought the Pepsi trademark. Megargel was unsuccessful in efforts to find funding to revive the brand and soon Pepsi-Cola's assets were purchased by Charles Guth, the president of Loft, Inc. Loft was a candy manufacturer with retail stores that contained soda fountains. He sought to replace Coca-Cola at his stores' fountains after The Coca-Cola Company refused to give him additional discounts on syrup. Guth then had Loft's chemists reformulate the Pepsi-Cola syrup formula.
On three occasions between 1922 and 1933, the Coca-Cola Company was offered the opportunity to purchase the Pepsi-Cola Company, which it declined on each occasion.

Growth in popularity
During the Great Depression, Pepsi gained popularity following the introduction in 1934 of a 12-ounce bottle. Prior to that, Pepsi and Coca-Cola sold their drinks in 6.5-ounce servings for about $0.05 a bottle.  With a radio advertising campaign featuring the popular jingle "Nickel, Nickel" – first recorded by the Tune Twisters in 1940 – Pepsi encouraged price-conscious consumers to double the volume their nickels could purchase. The jingle is arranged in a way that loops, creating a never-ending tune:"Pepsi-Cola hits the spot / Twelve full ounces, that's a lot / Twice as much for a nickel, too / Pepsi-Cola is the drink for you."Coming at a time of economic crisis, the campaign succeeded in boosting Pepsi's status. From 1936 to 1938, Pepsi-Cola's profits doubled.

Pepsi's success under Guth came while the Loft Candy business was faltering. Since he had initially used Loft's finances and facilities to establish the new Pepsi success, the near-bankrupt Loft Company sued Guth for possession of the Pepsi-Cola company. A long legal battle, Guth v. Loft, then ensued, with the case reaching the Delaware Supreme Court and ultimately ending in a loss for Guth.

Marketing

From the 1930s through the late 1950s, "Pepsi-Cola Hits The Spot" was the most commonly used slogan in the days of old-time radio, classic motion pictures and early days of television. Its jingle (conceived in the days when Pepsi cost only five cents) was used in many different forms with different lyrics. With the rise of radio, Pepsi-Cola utilized the services of a young, up-and-coming actress named Polly Bergen to promote products, oftentimes, lending her singing talents to the classic "...Hits The Spot" jingle.

Film actress Joan Crawford, after marrying Pepsi-Cola president Alfred N. Steele became a spokesperson for Pepsi, appearing in commercials, television specials, and televised beauty pageants on behalf of the company. Crawford also had images of the soft drink placed prominently in several of her later films. When Steele died in 1959, Crawford was appointed to the Board of Directors of Pepsi-Cola, a position she held until 1973, although she was not a board member of the larger PepsiCo, created in 1965.

Pepsi has been featured in several films, including Back to the Future Part II (1989), Home Alone (1990), Wayne's World (1992), Fight Club (1999),  World War Z (2013), and in films directed by Spike Lee.

Pepsi marketing has also been marred in controversy. In 1989, Pepsi commissioned a $5 million marketing campaign to coincide with the release of Madonna's song "Like a Prayer", but was cancelled following strong backlash regarding the religious themes in the song's music video. In 1992, the Pepsi Number Fever marketing campaign in the Philippines accidentally distributed 800,000 winning bottle caps for a 1 million peso grand prize, leading to riots and the deaths of five people.

In 1996, PepsiCo launched the highly successful Pepsi Stuff marketing strategy. "Project Blue" was launched in several international markets outside the United States in April. The launch included extravagant publicity stunts, such as a Concorde airplane painted in blue colors (which was owned by Air France) and a banner on the Mir space station. The Project Blue design was first tested in the United States in June 1997, and was released that December in preparation for Pepsi's 100th anniversary. It was at this point, the logo began to be referred to as the Pepsi Globe.

In October 2008, Pepsi announced that it would redesign its logo and re-brand many of its products by early 2009. In 2009, Pepsi, Diet Pepsi, and Pepsi Max began using all lower-case fonts for name brands. The brand's blue and red globe trademark became a series of "smiles," with the central white band arcing at different angles depending on the product until 2010. 

Pepsi released this logo in U.S. in late 2008. It was released in 2009 in Canada, Brazil, Bolivia, Guatemala, Nicaragua, Honduras, El Salvador, Colombia, Argentina, Puerto Rico, Costa Rica, Panama, Chile, Dominican Republic, the Philippines, and Australia. The new logo was released to the rest of the world in 2010. The old logo is still used in several international markets, and has been phased out most recently in France and Mexico.

Niche marketing

Walter Mack was named the new president of Pepsi-Cola and guided the company through the 1940s. Mack, who supported progressive causes, noticed that the company's strategy of using advertising for a general audience either ignored African Americans or used ethnic stereotypes in portraying Blacks. Up until the 1940s, the full revenue potential of what was called "the Negro market" was largely ignored by white-owned manufacturers in the U.S. 

Mack realized that Black people were an untapped niche market and that Pepsi stood to gain market share by targeting its advertising directly towards them. To this end, he hired Hennan Smith, an advertising executive "from the Negro newspaper field" to lead an all-black sales team, which had to be cut due to the onset of World War II.

In 1947, Walter Mack resumed his efforts, hiring Edward F. Boyd to lead a twelve-man team. They came up with advertising portraying black Americans in a positive light, such as one with a smiling mother holding a six pack of Pepsi while her son (a young Ron Brown, who grew up to be Secretary of Commerce) reaches up for one. Another ad campaign, titled "Leaders in Their Fields", profiled twenty prominent African Americans such as Nobel Peace Prize winner Ralph Bunche and photographer Gordon Parks.

Boyd also led a sales team composed entirely of blacks around the country to promote Pepsi. Racial segregation and Jim Crow laws were still in place throughout much of the U.S.; Boyd's team faced a great deal of discrimination as a result, from insults by Pepsi co-workers to threats by the Ku Klux Klan. On the other hand, it was able to use its anti-racism stance as a selling point, attacking Coke's reluctance to hire blacks and support by the chairman of The Coca-Cola Company for segregationist governor of Georgia Herman Talmadge. As a result, Pepsi's market share as compared to Coca-Cola's shot up dramatically in the 1950s with African American soft-drink consumers three times more likely to purchase Pepsi over Coke. After the sales team visited Chicago, Pepsi's share in the city overtook that of Coke for the first time.

Journalist Stephanie Capparell interviewed six men who were on the team in the late 1940s. The team members had a grueling schedule, working seven days a week, morning and night, for weeks on end. They visited bottlers, churches, ladies groups, schools, college campuses, YMCAs, community centers, insurance conventions, teacher and doctor conferences, and various civic organizations. They got famous jazzmen such as Duke Ellington and Lionel Hampton to promote Pepsi from the stage. No group was too small or too large to target for a promotion.

Pepsi advertisements avoided the stereotypical images common in the major media that depicted Aunt Jemimas and Uncle Bens, whose role was to draw a smile from white customers. Instead, it portrayed black customers as self-confident middle-class citizens who showed very good taste in their soft drinks. They were economical too, as Pepsi bottles were twice the size.

This focus on the market for black people caused some consternation within the company and among its affiliates. It did not want to seem focused on black customers for fear white customers would be pushed away. In a national meeting, Mack tried to assuage the 500 bottlers in attendance by pandering to them, saying "We don't want it to become known as a nigger drink." After Mack left the company in 1950, support for the black sales team faded and it was cut.

Boyd was replaced in 1952 by Harvey C. Russell Jr., who was notable for his marketing campaigns towards black youth in New Orleans. These campaigns, held at locales attended largely by black children, would encourage children to collect Pepsi bottle caps, which they could then exchange for rewards. One example is Pepsi's 1954 "Pepsi Day at the Beach" event, where New Orleans children could ride rides at an amusement park in exchange for Pepsi bottle caps. By the end of the event, 125,000 bottle caps been collected. According to The Pepsi Cola World, the New Orleans campaign was a success; once people's supply of bottle caps ran out, the only way they could get more was to buy more Pepsi.

Rivalry with Coca-Cola

According to Consumer Reports, in the 1970s, the rivalry continued to heat up the market. Pepsi conducted blind taste tests in stores, in what was called the "Pepsi Challenge". These tests suggested that more consumers preferred the taste of Pepsi to Coca-Cola. The sales of Pepsi started to climb, and Pepsi kicked off the "Challenge" across the nation. This became known as the "cola wars".

In 1985, The Coca-Cola Company, amid much publicity, changed its formula. The theory has been advanced that New Coke, as the reformulated drink came to be known, was invented specifically in response to the Pepsi Challenge. However, a consumer backlash led to Coca-Cola quickly reintroducing the original formula as "Coca-Cola Classic".

In 1989, Billy Joel mentioned the rivalry between the two companies in the song "We Didn't Start the Fire". The line "Rock & Roller Cola Wars" refers to Pepsi and Coke's usage of various musicians in advertising campaigns. Coke used Paula Abdul, while Pepsi used Michael Jackson. Both companies then competed to get other musicians to advertise its beverages.

According to Beverage Digests 2008 report on carbonated soft drinks, PepsiCo's U.S. market share is 30.8 percent, while The Coca-Cola Company's is 42.7 percent. Coca-Cola outsells Pepsi in most parts of the U.S., notable exceptions being central Appalachia, North Dakota, and Utah. In the city of Buffalo, New York, Pepsi outsells Coca-Cola by a two-to-one margin.

Overall, Coca-Cola continues to outsell Pepsi in almost all areas of the world. However, exceptions include: Oman, India, Saudi Arabia, Pakistan, the Dominican Republic, Guatemala, the Canadian provinces of Quebec, Newfoundland and Labrador, Nova Scotia, and Prince Edward Island, and Northern Ontario.

Pepsi had long been the drink of French-Canadians, and it continues to hold its dominance by relying on local Québécois celebrities (especially Claude Meunier, of La Petite Vie fame) to sell its product. PepsiCo introduced the Quebec slogan "here, it's Pepsi" (Ici, c'est Pepsi) in response to Coca-Cola ads proclaiming "Around the world, it's Coke" (Partout dans le monde, c'est Coke).

As of 2012, Pepsi is the third most popular carbonated drink in India, with a 15% market share, behind Sprite and Thums Up. In comparison, Coca-Cola is the fourth most popular carbonated drink, occupying a mere 8.8% of the Indian market share. By most accounts, Coca-Cola was India's leading soft drink until 1977, when it left India because of the new foreign exchange laws which mandated majority shareholding in companies to be held by Indian shareholders. The Coca-Cola Company was unwilling to dilute its stake in its Indian unit as required by the Foreign Exchange Regulation Act (FERA), thus sharing its formula with an entity in which it did not have majority shareholding.

In 1988, PepsiCo gained entry to India by creating a joint venture with the Punjab government-owned Punjab Agro Industrial Corporation (PAIC) and Voltas India Limited. This joint venture marketed and sold Lehar Pepsi until 1991, when the use of foreign brands was allowed; PepsiCo bought out its partners and ended the joint venture in 1994. In 1993, The Coca-Cola Company returned in pursuance of India's Liberalization policy.

In Russia, Pepsi initially had a larger market share than Coke, but it was undercut once the Cold War ended. In 1972, PepsiCo struck a barter agreement with the then government of the Soviet Union, in which PepsiCo was granted exportation and Western marketing rights to Stolichnaya vodka in exchange for importation and Soviet marketing of Pepsi. This exchange led to Pepsi being the first foreign product sanctioned for sale in the Soviet Union.

Reminiscent of the way that Coca-Cola became a cultural icon and its global spread spawned words like "cocacolonization", Pepsi-Cola and its relation to the Soviet system turned it into an icon. In the early 1990s, the term "Pepsi-stroika" began appearing as a pun on "perestroika", the reform policy of the Soviet Union under Mikhail Gorbachev. Critics viewed the policy as an attempt to usher in Western products in deals there with the old elites. Pepsi, as one of the first American products in the Soviet Union, became a symbol of that relationship and the Soviet policy. This was reflected in Russian author Victor Pelevin's book Generation P.

In 1992, following the dissolution of the Soviet Union, Coca-Cola was introduced to the Russian market. As it came to be associated with the new system and Pepsi with the old, Coca-Cola rapidly captured a significant market share that might otherwise have required years to achieve. By July 2005, Coca-Cola enjoyed a market share of 19.4 percent, followed by Pepsi with 13 percent.

Pepsi was introduced in Romania in 1966, during the early liberalization policies of Nicolae Ceaușescu, opening up a factory at Constanța in 1967. This was done as a barter agreement similar to the one in the USSR, however, Romanian wine would be sold in the United States instead. The product quickly became popular, especially among young people, but due to the austerity measures imposed in the 1980s, the product became scarce and rare to find. Starting from 1991, PepsiCo entered the new Romanian market economy, and still maintains a bigger popularity than its competitor, Coca-Cola, introduced in Romania in 1992, despite heavy competition during the 1990s (sometime between 2000 and 2005, Pepsi overtook Coca-Cola in sales in Romania).

Pepsi did not sell soft drinks in Israel until 1991. Many Israelis and some American Jewish organizations attributed Pepsi's previous reluctance to expand operations in Israel to fears of an Arab boycott. Pepsi, which has a large and lucrative business in the Arab world, denied that, saying that economic, rather than political, reasons kept it out of Israel.

Pepsiman

Pepsiman is an official Pepsi mascot from Pepsi's Japanese corporate branch, created sometime around the mid-1990s. Pepsiman took on three different outfits, each one representing the current style of the Pepsi can in distribution. Twelve commercials were created featuring the character. His role in the advertisements is to appear with Pepsi to thirsty people or people craving soda. 

Pepsiman happens to appear at just the right time with the product. After delivering the beverage, sometimes Pepsiman would encounter a difficult and action-oriented situation which would result in injury. Pepsiman is mostly silent, and he has no face except for a hole that opens up whenever he delivers a Pepsi. Another more minor mascot, Pepsiwoman, also featured in a few of her own commercials for Pepsi Twist; her appearance is basically a female Pepsiman wearing a lemon-shaped balaclava.

In 1994, Sega-AM2 released the Sega Saturn version of its arcade fighting game Fighting Vipers. In this game, Pepsiman was included as a special character, with his specialty listed as being the ability to "quench one's thirst." He does not appear in any other version or sequel. In 1999, KID developed a video game for the PlayStation entitled Pepsiman. As the titular character, the player runs "on rails" (forced motion on a scrolling linear path), skateboards, rolls, and stumbles through various areas, avoiding dangers and collecting cans of Pepsi, all while trying to reach a thirsty person as in the commercials.

Electric trucks
Elon Musk announced that Tesla is starting Tesla Semi production in 2022 October and that Pepsi is going to get the first electric trucks starting December.

Sports sponsorships
Pepsi has official sponsorship deals with the National Football League, National Hockey League, and National Basketball Association. In 2007, and from 2013 to 2022, Pepsi sponsored the NFL's Super Bowl halftime shows. It was the sponsor of Major League Soccer until December 2015 and Major League Baseball until April 2017, both leagues signing deals with Coca-Cola. From 1999 to 2020, Pepsi also had the naming rights to the Pepsi Center, an indoor sports and entertainment facility in Denver, Colorado, until the venue's new naming rights were announced on October 22, 2020. 

In 1997, after his sponsorship with Coca-Cola ended, retired NASCAR Sprint Cup Series driver turned Fox NASCAR announcer Jeff Gordon signed a long-term contract with Pepsi, and he drives with the Pepsi logos on his car with various paint schemes for about 2 races each year, usually a darker paint scheme during nighttime races. Pepsi has remained as one of his sponsors ever since. Pepsi has also sponsored the NFL Rookie of the Year award since 2002.

Pepsi has the first global sponsorship deals with the UEFA Champions League and the UEFA Women's Champions League starting in the 2015–16 season along with the sister brand, Pepsi Max and became the global sponsor of the competition.

Pepsi also has sponsorship deals in international cricket teams. The Pakistani national cricket team is one of the teams that the brand sponsors. The team wears the Pepsi logo on the front of their test and ODI test match clothing.

The Buffalo Bisons, an American Hockey League team, was sponsored by Pepsi-Cola in its later years; the team adopted the beverage's red, white, and blue color scheme along with a modification of the Pepsi logo (with the word "Buffalo" in place of the Pepsi-Cola wordmark). The Bisons ceased operations in 1970, making way for the Buffalo Sabres of the NHL.

Pepsi also has been a sponsor of the Carolina Hurricanes of the National Hockey League since the team moved to North Carolina in 1997.

In 2017, Pepsi was the jersey sponsor of the Papua New Guinea national basketball team.

Ingredients

In the United States, Pepsi is made with carbonated water, high fructose corn syrup, caramel color, sugar, phosphoric acid, caffeine, citric acid, and natural flavors. A can of Pepsi (12 fl ounces) has 41 grams of carbohydrates (all from sugars), 30 mg of sodium, 0 grams of fat, 0 grams of protein, 38 mg of caffeine, and 150 calories. 

Pepsi has 10 more calories and two more grams of sugar and carbohydrates than Coca-Cola. Caffeine-Free Pepsi contains the same ingredients but without the caffeine.

Variants

Fictional drinks
Pepsi Perfect: A vitamin-enriched Pepsi variation in special bottle shown in the movie Back to the Future Part II in scenes set in the year 2015. This was later released as a limited-edition drink. Only 6,500 bottles were available for $20.15, they have since been sold for hundreds of dollars on eBay.

See also

 Pepsi spokespeople
 Pepsi Max Big One (roller coaster)
 Pepsi Orange Streak (roller coaster)
 Pepsi Python (roller coaster)
 Mountain Dew
 AMP Energy
 Citrus Blast

References
Notes

Bibliography
 Beverage World Magazine, January 1998, "Celebrating a Century of Refreshment: Pepsi — The First 100 Years"
 Stoddard, Bob. Pepsi-Cola – 100 Years (1997), General Publishing Group, Los Angeles, California
 "History & Milestones" (1996), Pepsi packet
 Louis, J.C. & Yazijian, Harvey Z. "The Cola Wars" (1980), Everest House, Publishers, New York

External links

 
 
 

PepsiCo cola brands
Products introduced in 1898
American drinks
Patent medicines
1893 establishments in North Carolina
Caffeinated soft drinks